Mohammad Akbar Barakzai is a politician in Afghanistan, serving as the Governor of Baghlan from 2009 to 2010.

Biography
Mohammad Akbar was born in Baghlan Province of Afghanistan. He graduated from Baghlan's Agriculture school in 1989. Akbar has served as the deputy administrator in the Ministry of Water and Power and also worked at the Ministry of Mines for a year.

References

External links

Mining ministers of Afghanistan
Governors of Baghlan Province
Pashtun people
Living people
Year of birth missing (living people)
People from Baghlan Province